Neil Anderson (born 27 February 1979) is an Irish cricketer. He is a right-handed batsman and a left-arm spin bowler. He played two matches for Ireland in 1998, against MCC and Bangladesh. He also played one List A match for Northern Ireland as part of the cricket tournament at the 1998 Commonwealth Games.

References
Cricket Archive profile

1979 births
Living people
Irish cricketers
Cricketers from Northern Ireland
Cricketers at the 1998 Commonwealth Games
Commonwealth Games competitors for Northern Ireland
People from Banbridge